Shahrestanak (also Romanized as Shahrestānak, Shahristānak, and Shakhrshtanak) is a village in Dashtabi-ye Sharqi Rural District, Dashtabi District, Buin Zahra County, Qazvin Province, Iran. In the 2006 census, its population was 1,564, in 404 families. The village is populated by Azerbaijanians.

References 

Populated places in Buin Zahra County